The Phantom of the Operetta may refer to:

 The Phantom of the Operetta (1955 film), an Argentine film
 The Phantom of the Operetta (1960 film), a Mexican film